DPC may refer to:

Science and technology
 Diphenyl carbonate, an acyclic carbonate ester
 Diphenylcarbazide, a carbazide compound

Medicine
 Days post coitum, term commonly used when referring to the age of an embryo
 Direct primary care, a model of healthcare that bills patients directly rather than billing insurance companies
 Mothers against decapentaplegic homolog 4 or Deleted in Pancreatic Cancer-4 (DPC4), a cell signaling protein

Computing
 Deferred Procedure Call, Windows mechanism to defer lower-priority tasks
 Dirty paper coding, a coding technique that can subtract a known interference

Government and military
 Defence Planning Committee (NATO)
 Department of Premier and Cabinet (disambiguation)
 Due Process Clause, of the United States Constitution
 United States Domestic Policy Council, a forum used by the President of the United States
 Displaced persons camps in post–World War II Europe
 Data Protection Commissioner, the data privacy authority in Ireland

Organizations
 Digital Preservation Coalition, a non-profit company that seeks to preserve digital resources
 Doane Pet Care, US pet food manufacturer
 Duke Lemur Center , formerly Duke University Primate Center. The collection code is (DPC)

Other uses
 Damp-proof course, in damp proofing
 Dominique Provost-Chalkley (born 1990), British-Canadian actress
 Dota Pro Circuit, esports tournament circuit for the video game Dota 2
 Dubai Production City, a media production zone